Bras is a surname. Notable people with the surname include:

Edgar A. Bras (1841–1923), Union Army officer and Medal of Honor recipient
Mart Bras (born 1950), Dutch water polo player
Martine Bras (born 1978), Dutch cyclist
Michel Bras (born 1946), French chef
Rafael L. Bras (born 1950), Puerto Rican civil engineer